Somebody Else's Child is a book written by Terris McMahan Grimes and published by Onyx on 1 March 1996 which later went on to win the Anthony Award for Best Paperback Original in 1997 and tied for the Best First Novel in the same year.

References 

Anthony Award-winning works
Crime books
1996 books